Live in Berlin: A Film by Anton Corbijn is a live video album by English electronic music band Depeche Mode, featuring a live concert directed and filmed by Anton Corbijn. It was released on 14 November 2014 by Mute Records and Columbia Records. It was filmed on location at the O2 World in Berlin on 25 and 27 November 2013 during the band's Delta Machine Tour.

The deluxe edition in five discs includes the Live in Berlin DVD, the Live in Berlin Soundtrack concert audio on two CDs, second DVD Alive in Berlin, and the 2013 album Delta Machine 5.1 mix on Blu-ray. The standard edition consists of the concert DVD and the soundtrack. The second DVD featuring the full live show combined with behind-the-scenes footage, interviews with the band and their fans, and a two-song acoustic session filmed at Salon Bel Ami, the oldest existing brothel in Berlin, is also available as Depeche Mode: Alive in Berlin (HD) on iTunes from 19 December 2014. The soundtrack was also released as a double CD package.

Before its release, the DVD was launched with one-off theatrical screenings in selected cities around the world, including over 40 cinemas in Germany.

Track listing

Box set

Alive in Berlin – DVD
Full live show + 15 interview pieces
Condemnation (Bordello Acoustic Sessions)
Judas (Bordello Acoustic Sessions)

Delta Machine – 5.1 audio on Blu-ray
"Welcome to My World"
"Angel"
"Heaven"
"Secret to the End"
"My Little Universe"
"Slow"
"Broken"
"The Child Inside"
"Soft Touch/Raw Nerve"
"Should Be Higher"
"Alone"
"Soothe My Soul"
"Goodbye"
"Long Time Lie"
"Happens All the Time"
"Always"
"All That's Mine"

Two-disc edition

Personnel
Credits adapted from the liner notes of Live in Berlin.

Depeche Mode
 Dave Gahan
 Martin Gore
 Andrew Fletcher

Additional musicians
 Christian Eigner – drums
 Peter Gordeno – keyboards, backing vocals, bass guitar on "A Pain That I'm Used To", piano

Technical

 Anton Corbijn – artistic direction, stage design, film direction, camera
 Paul Normandale – lighting direction
 Kirsten Sohrauer – film production
 Philipp Hennig – camera
 Jan-Hinrich Hoffman – camera
 Martin Schlecht – camera
 Oliver Moron – camera
 Friedemann Frank – sound
 James Rose – film Editor
 Necker – audio recording
 Antony King – audio recording
 Kerry Hopwood – audio recording technical engineering
 Tom Worley – audio recording technical engineering
 Terence Hulkes – audio recording technical engineering
 Adrian Hall – Stereo and 5.1 mixing
 Joe Adams – additional Pro Tools editing
 MJ – audio production
 Miles Showell – Stereo audio mastering
 Simon Gibson – 5.1 audio mastering
 Ian Duncan – audio dubbing mixing

Artwork
 Stephen Averill – packaging
 Anton Corbijn – logos, photography, visuals, art direction

Charts

Weekly charts

Year-end charts

Certifications

References

2014 live albums
2014 video albums
Columbia Records live albums
Columbia Records video albums
Depeche Mode live albums
Depeche Mode video albums
Live video albums
Mute Records live albums
Mute Records video albums